CMAC is the Cipher-based Message Authentication Code, a cryptographic algorithm.

CMAC may also refer to:

Science and technology
 7-amino-4-chloromethylcoumarin, a blue fluorescent dye used in microscopy.
 Cerebellar model articulation controller, type of neural network
 Continuous monitoring and adaptive control (stormwater management), a type of stormwater BMP

Organizations
 Cambodian Mine Action Centre, see Land mines in Cambodia
 Center for Maritime Archaeology and Conservation (CMAC), at Texas A&M University, US
 Court Martial Appeal Court of Canada
 Crystal Mountain Alpine Club, a ski racing club at the Crystal Mountain ski resort in Washington State, US

Other uses
 Constellation Brands – Marvin Sands Performing Arts Center, an outdoor concert venue in Canadaigua, New York, US

See also
 C-MAC (disambiguation)